Roy Evans (10 November 1913 – 17 July 1987) was an Australian rules footballer who played for Footscray in the Victorian Football League (VFL) during the late 1930s. Evans was a member of Victorian Football Association (VFA) club Yarraville's inaugural premiership  side in 1935 before he was recruited by Footscray the following season. He played as both a wingman and centreman during his 49-game stint with Footscray, captaining them to their first ever finals campaign in 1938.

References

External links

1913 births
1987 deaths
Australian rules footballers from Victoria (Australia)
Western Bulldogs players
Yarraville Football Club players